Lewis Lake can refer to the following:

United States
Lewis Lake (Kanabec County, Minnesota)
Lewis Lake, in Sumter Township, McLeod County, Minnesota
Lewis Lake (Massachusetts), located in Winthrop, Massachusetts
Lewis Lake, Minnesota, an unincorporated community in Kanabec County, Minnesota
Lewis Lake (Wyoming), a lake in Yellowstone National Park
Lake Lewis, a temporary lake created by the Missoula Floods

Canada
 Lewis Lake, Nova Scotia, various places